Cancellaria jayana is a species of sea snail, a marine gastropod mollusk in the family Cancellariidae, the nutmeg snails.

Description
The size of an adult shell varies between 18 mm and 25 mm

Distribution
This species is distributed in the Pacific Ocean along Mexico and Panama.

References

External links
 

Cancellariidae
Gastropods described in 1958